K'ayrani (Aymara k'ayra frog, -ni a suffix to indicate ownership, "the one with a frog (or frogs)", also spelled Jairani) is a mountain north of the Apolobamba mountain range in the Andes of Peru, about  high. It is located in the Puno Region, Sandia Province, Quiaca District. Near K'ayrani there are various little lakes. The largest of them is Ch'uxñaquta ("green lake", Choccñacota, Chojñecota) in the southwest.

References 

Mountains of Puno Region
Mountains of Peru